Arismendy Peguero Matos (born 2 August 1980) is a sprinter from the Dominican Republic who specializes in the 400 metres. He was born in La Romana.

Peguero finished fifth in 4 x 400 metres relay at the 2006 World Indoor Championships, together with teammates Danis García, Juan Betances and Carlos Santa. He later won a bronze medal in 400 m at the 2006 Central American and Caribbean Games. His success earned him the title Dominican Republic male athlete of the year in 2006.

References
 

1980 births
Living people
Dominican Republic male sprinters
Athletes (track and field) at the 2008 Summer Olympics
Olympic athletes of the Dominican Republic
Athletes (track and field) at the 2003 Pan American Games
Athletes (track and field) at the 2007 Pan American Games
Athletes (track and field) at the 2011 Pan American Games
People from La Romana, Dominican Republic
Pan American Games silver medalists for the Dominican Republic
Pan American Games bronze medalists for the Dominican Republic
Pan American Games medalists in athletics (track and field)
World Athletics Indoor Championships medalists
Medalists at the 2003 Pan American Games
Medalists at the 2007 Pan American Games
Medalists at the 2011 Pan American Games
Central American and Caribbean Games medalists in athletics
Central American and Caribbean Games bronze medalists for the Dominican Republic
Competitors at the 2006 Central American and Caribbean Games
20th-century Dominican Republic people
21st-century Dominican Republic people